Arkle Beck Meadows, Whaw is a  biological Site of Special Scientific Interest (SSSI) at Whaw in Arkengarthdale in the Yorkshire Dales. The SSSI was first notified in 1986 and is due to the hay meadows which are traditionally managed by hay cropping and grazing.

References
 

Sites of Special Scientific Interest in North Yorkshire
Sites of Special Scientific Interest notified in 1986
Arkengarthdale
Meadows in North Yorkshire